Abdallah Ally Mtolea (born June 3, 1976) is a Tanzanian politician and a member of the CUF political party. He was elected MP of Temeke District in 2015.

References 

1976 births
Living people
Tanzanian MPs 2015–2020
Deputy government ministers of Tanzania